This is a list of notable people associated with Berkhamsted, a town in Dacorum, Hertfordshire, England.

Academic and Medical

 Henry Atkins (1554/5–1635), President of the College of Physicians, 1606–1635
 George Field (1777?–1854), chemist
 George William Lefevre M.D. (1798–1846), English physician and travel writer.
 Christopher Edmund Broome (24 July 1812 – 15 November 1886), mycologist
 John Evans (17 November 1823 – 31 May 1908), archaeologist and geologist
 Raymond Greene (1901–1982), endocrinologist and mountaineer (brother of Graham Greene).
 Ian Bradley (28 May 1950–), academic, author, theologian, Church of Scotland minister, journalist and broadcaster.
Moved to Berkhamsted
 G. M. Trevelyan (1876–1962), noted British historian, as a resident he took part in historical pageants in the town.

Artists and Writers

 Poet and hymn writer William Cowper (1731–1800), one of the most popular poets of his time, Cowper changed the direction of eighteenth century nature poetry by writing of everyday life and scenes of the English countryside.
 Novelist Graham Greene (1904–1991), whose father was headmaster of Berkhamsted School, which Greene attended. One of Greene's novels, The Human Factor, set there and mentions several places in the town, including Kings Road and Berkhamsted Common. In his autobiography, Greene wrote that he has been 'moulded in a special way through Berkhamsted'. Greene's life and works are celebrated annually during the last weekend in September with a festival organised by the Graham Greene Birthplace Trust.
 Richard Mabey (20 February 1941–), writer and broadcaster, chiefly on the relations between nature and culture
 Jonathan Carr (1942–2008), journalist and author
 Antony Hopkins (21 March 1921 – 6 May 2014), English composer, pianist and conductor, as well as a writer and radio broadcaster.
 Stanley Wilson (1899-1953), composer and music teacher, born in Berkhamstead and educated at Berkhamsted School.
Moved to Berkhamsted
 Maria Edgeworth (1 January 1768 – 22 May 1849), prolific Anglo-Irish writer, adult and realistic children's literature and was a significant figure in the evolution of the novel in Europe, lived at Edgeworth House in Berkhamsted as a child.
 H. E. Todd (1908–1988) British writer of children's fiction, married and died in Berkhamsted.
 Hilda van Stockum (9 February 1908 – 1 November 2006), Dutch born children's author and artist, also died in Berkhamsted.
 Reg Butler (1913–1981), sculptor.
 Matt Whyman (1969–), novelist and advice columnist

Local Historians

 Percy Birtchnell (1910–1986), local historian. His publications include "A History of Berkhamsted" and "Bygone Berkhamsted" both published by Clunberry.
Moved to Berkhamsted
 Scott Hastie, poet and local historian

Media, Actors and Singers

 Sir Hugh Greene (1910–1987), Director-General of the BBC from 1960 to 1969 (brother of Graham Greene)
 Michael Hordern (1911–1995), actor, born in The Poplars, an eighteenth-century townhouse on the high street
 Esther Rantzen (1940–), television presenter
 Valerie Van Ost (25 July 1944–), actress
 Television presenter Nick Owen (1947–)
 Singer Sarah Brightman (1960–)
 Simon Minter (07 September 1992–), YouTube personality known as Miniminter
 Roman Kemp (28 January 1993–), radio host, tv personality
  Olajide Olatunji (19 June 1993–), YouTube personality, boxer, rapper, singer and songwriter known as KSI

Moved to Berkhamsted
 Harry Worth (1917 in Yorkshire −1989), comedian, lived and died in Berkhamsted
 John Cleese, comic actor has lived in Berkhamsted.
 Timothy Bentinck, actor and 12th Earl of Portland, grew up in Berkhamsted
 Geoffrey Palmer, actor
 Adrian Scarborough, actor
 Peter Drury, sports commentator
 Pete Donaldson, podcaster / voice artist

Military

 Colonel Daniel Axtell (1622 – 19 October 1660) grocery apprentice, baptist and soldier who rose through the ranks to play a prominent part in the English Civil War; who after the English Restoration in 1660, was one of nine found guilty of regicide for taking part in the trial of Charles I who were hanged, drawn and quartered.
 World War I General Sir Horace Smith-Dorrien (1858–1930) and his heroic naval officer brother Henry Theophilus Smith-Dorrien (1850–1935) who was “more or less responsible for the commencement of the Egyptian War” (1881).

Political

 Henry Cary, 1st Viscount Falkland English landowner and politician who sat in the House of Commons from 1601 to 1622.
 Augustus Smith (15 September 1804 – 31 July 1872) born in Berkhamsted, MP for Truro and governor of the Isles of Scilly, Augustus Smith stopped the enclosure of the Berkhamsted Common. "Possibly no-one ever connected with the town more merits such a recognition than the illustrious educationalist and public-spirited man ... Augustus Smith who restarted Berkhamsted School and was the leading founder of the first elementary school in the locality." West Herts and Watford Observer, 1908.  Augustus Smith  today is commemorated by the award of the Augustus Smith scholarship for state school students in Berkhamsted.
 Albert Andrews (13 September 1881 – 25 October 1960) was a provincial politician, Alberta, Canada.
Lawrence Ward, former Serjeant at Arms of the British House of Commons, attended St Thomas More junior school (1977 to 1978) and later lived at Billet Lane from 1999 until 2001.

Moved to Berkhamsted
 During World War II Charles de Gaulle, lived in exiled from Vichy France (October 1941 to September 1942) with his family, at a house called Rodinghead in Frithsden, Berkhamsted

Sports/physical

 Thomas Stevens (24 December 1854–?) was the first person to circle the globe by bicycle. He rode a large-wheeled Ordinary, also known as a penny-farthing, from April 1884 to December 1886.
 Frank Broome (1915–1994), professional footballer and manager
Jonathan Bond (19 May 1993), professional football goalkeeper

Others

Moved to Berkhamsted
 Richard Scott, early settler of Providence in the Colony of Rhode Island and Providence Plantations
 Edmund Rice, early settler of Massachusetts Bay Colony
 Peter the Wild Boy (c. 1713 – 22 February 1785), feral boy with learning difficulties and possible Pitt–Hopkins syndrome from Germany, who was original brought to England as a curiosity but later was cared for in Northchurch and Berkhamsted.
 Derek Simpson, Joint-General Secretary of the UK's biggest private-sector trade union, Unite, from 2007–2010, previously the General Secretary of Amicus from 2002–2007
 Carolyn McCall, Chief Executive of easyJet

Association through education in Berkhamsted

 Richard Field (1561–1616), clergyman and theologian
 Sir Algernon Methuen (1856–1924), founder and owner, Methuen & Co, publishers, 1889–1924
 Clementine Churchill, Baroness Spencer-Churchill (1885–1977), wife of Winston Churchill
 Charles Seltman (1886–1957), author and archeologist
 Clifford Allen, 1st Baron Allen of Hurtwood (1889–1939), politician and peace campaigner
 Sir Donald Fergusson (1891–1963), Permanent Secretary, Ministry of Agriculture and Fisheries, 1936–1945, and Ministry of Fuel and Power, 1945–1952
 H. W. Tilman (1898–1977), mountaineer and sailor
 A. K. Chesterton (1899–1973), fascist, and first Chairman, National Front, 1967–1971
 F. S. Smythe (1900–1949), mountaineer and author
 Rex Tremlett (1903–1986), author and prospector
 Claud Cockburn (1904–1981), writer and journalist
 Bill Fiske, Baron Fiske (1905–1975), first leader of the Greater London Council, 1964–1967, and Chairman of the Decimal Currency Board
 Sir Peter Quennell (1905–1993), writer and editor
 Sir Colin Buchanan (1907–2001), town planner
 Michael Sherard (1910–1998), born Malcolm Sherrard, fashion designer and academic
 Sir Kenneth Cork (1913–1991), accountant, and Lord Mayor of the City of London, 1978–1979
 Margot Jefferys (1916–1999), Professor of Medical Sociology, Bedford College, London, 1968–1982
 Robert Simons (1922–2011), cricketer
 Stephen Dodgson (1924–2013), composer and broadcaster
 Mary Wimbush (19 March 1924 – 31 October 2005), actress
 Mark Boxer (Marc) (1931–1988), cartoonist and magazine editor
 Michael Podro (1931–2008), art historian
 Alexander Goehr (1932–), composer and 1987 Reith Lecture
 Derek Fowlds (1937–2020), actor
 Sir Anthony Cleaver (1938–), Chairman of the Medical Research Council, 1998–2006
 Sir Robin Knox-Johnston (1939–), yachtsman
 John Bly (1939–), antiques expert
 Michael Meacher (1939–), politician
 Kit Wright (1944–), children's poet
 Keith Mans (1946–), politician
 Alan Goldberg (1954–), warden of western marble arch synagogue
 Lieutenant General Sir Mark Mans (1955–), Adjutant-General to the Forces
 Emma Fielding (1966–), actress
 Roger Moorhouse (1968–), historian and author
 Stephen Campbell Moore (1977–), born Stephen Thorpe, actor
 Carla Chases (1984–), actress
 Talulah Riley (1985–), actress
 Simon Minter (07 September 1992–), YouTube personality known as Miniminter
 Roman Kemp (28 January 1993–), radio host, TV personality
Jonathan Bond (19 May 1993), professional football goalkeeper
  Olajide Olatunji (19 June 1993–), YouTube personality, boxer, rapper, singer and songwriter known as KSI

Associated with the Manor and/or Berkhamsted castle

Ælfgifu (d. AD 970) queen consort of King Eadwig of England (r. 955–959)
Robert of Mortain half brother of William the Conqueror 
William, Count of Mortain son of Robert of Mortain
Ranulf Chancellor of Henry I
Thomas Becket Archbishop and Chancellor of Henry II of England
Henry II of England
Berengaria of Navarre wife of King Richard I of England
Isabella of Angouleme wife of King John of England
Geoffrey Fitz Peter, 1st Earl of Essex chief minister of Richard I of England and John of England
Louis VIII of France captured the castle during the First Barons' War against John of England
Richard, 1st Earl of Cornwall brother of Henry III
Sanchia of Provence wife of Richard, 1st Earl of Cornwall
Edmund, 2nd Earl of Cornwall son of Richard, 1st Earl of Cornwall
Edward I of England
Margaret of France wife of Edward I of England
Piers Gaveston favourite of Edward II
Isabella of France wife of Edward II
Edward III
Edward, the Black Prince eldest son of Edward III
John II of France prisoner of Edward, the Black Prince
Joan, the Maid of Kent wife of Edward, the Black Prince
Richard II of England
Robert de Vere, Duke of Ireland favourite of Richard II of England
John Holland, 1st Duke of Exeter favourite of Richard II of England
Geoffrey Chaucer Clerk of Works
Henry IV of England
Henry V of England
Henry VI of England
Cecily Neville, Duchess of York, mother of Edward IV and Richard III of England

Fictional characters
 BBC Radio 4 character Ed Reardon, Berkhamsted resident.

References

Hertfordshire-related lists
People from Berkhamsted
Berkhamsted
People from Dacorum (district)